Octavio Medellín (1907–1999) was a Mexican-American sculptor and artist, most commonly known for his Mexican-influenced artwork in Texas. Medellín believed that “sincere art must be elemental and close to the earth,” and he strove to create art influenced by “the common people and everyday life,” not “politics” or “sophisticated ideas.” Throughout the 1930s and 1940s, Medellín's work consisted of various paintings and sculptures that are now in an exhibition and digital library in Southern Methodist University's Bywaters Special Collections.

Early life
Born of the son of an Otomi Indian mine worker in San Luis Potosi, Mexico in 1907, Medellín's native country was turning violent and riots were erupting more frequently than before. The violent chaos of the revolution in his country caused his family to relocate several times before they would eventually settle in to San Antonio, Texas in 1920. Before moving to San Antonio, Medellín had demonstrated an intriguing passion for the arts when he was able to attend school at the age of 11. Medellín's father had been reported to have been imprisoned during their time in Mexico but was released as the fighting began to dwindle. Due to this, it remains a mystery as to why Medellín's father had returned to Mexico, where he would tragically die by the same forces of the revolution that caused him to move his family to San Antonio.

After hearing the news of his father's death, Medellín would take on several odd jobs in order to provide for his family. Shortly after, Medellín would attend the San Antonio Art Institute to pursue a career in art with other well-known Hispanic artists such as José Arpa and Xavier Gonzales. He later moved in 1928 to continue his art studies at the Chicago Art Institute. A year into his college education in 1929, he returned to his native country to start a two-year study of Mexico's art, style, customs, and history. Medellín traveled "throughout the Gulf Coast, including the Yucatan" and explored the various talent and art created by the rural areas and the many "ancient ruins and sculpture of the Mayan and Toltec Indians." On his voyage, he met and became lifetime friends with painter, Carlos Mérida, up until Mérida's death. It was throughout this time Medellín was heavily inspired by his discoveries of the art that defined his heritage and helped him create a myriad of his own artworks.

Career

Medellín returned to San Antonio in 1931 to teach at the Witte Museum, and later open up La Villita Art Gallery with a few other local artists. He was also one of the Dallas Nine, a group of influential artists active in Dallas between 1930 and 1940 who created artworks drawing influence from the Southwest. It was around this time that he met a young artist named Lucy Maverick whose family was very influential in San Antonio in the late 19th century and beginning of the 20th century on their efforts of historic preservation. Maverick heavily supported and encouraged him, even going as far as funding his journey to Mexico to study of the ruins at Chichén Itzá. He worked on his own pieces and taught at the same time, not only at the Witte Museum, but at several other places, such as North Texas State Teachers College (now the University of North Texas), Southern Methodist University, and the Dallas Museum of Fine Arts School. It was during this time that Medellín experimented with other forms of art such as ceramics, mosaics, glass works, and lost-wax bronze casting. As he learned these new techniques, he would also teach them to students in his class. In 1966 he opened his own school, the Medellin School of Sculpture in Dallas, where he would continue to teach until 1979. After retirement, he moved to a small town in Texas named Bandera with his wife, Consuelo.

Many institutions and museums used his sculptures throughout the years, like the Dallas Museum of Arts, the Witte Museum in San Antonio, and the Museum of Modern Art in New York. It was not until 1989 when Medellín's family and himself donated most of his art pieces to the Southern Methodist University, where they currently stay at the Bywaters Special Collections. After having directed his own school and donated his works to multiple institutions, he would shortly pass away in 1999.

Medellín's notable art and sculptures
 "Xtol: Dance of the Ancient Mayan People"
 "The Promised Land"
 "Mazatl Tecutli, Lord of the Deer"
 "Landing Eagle"
 "Garden of the Glorious Mysteries"
 "Menorah"
 "Conceived" 
 "Mother and Child"
 "The Son"

See also
 Mexican Revolution
 Mexican-Americans
 Mexican Art
 Otomi

References

External links
 "Octavio Medellin Art Work and Papers, Bywaters Special Collections, Southern Methodist University"

1907 births
1999 deaths
People from San Luis Potosí
People from San Antonio
Mexican emigrants to the United States
20th-century American sculptors